Noolaar River is a river flowing through Thiruvarur district, Tamil Nadu, India.

References

See also 
List of rivers of Tamil Nadu

Rivers of Tamil Nadu
Tiruvarur district
Rivers of India